Chambri may refer to:
Chambri people
Chambri language